Brigadier General Bonner Frank Fellers (February 7, 1896 – October 7, 1973) was a United States Army officer who served during World War II as a military attaché and director of psychological warfare. He is notable as the military attaché in Egypt whose extensive transmissions of detailed British tactical information were unknowingly intercepted by Axis agents and passed to Nazi German Generalfeldmarschall Erwin Rommel for over six months, which contributed to disastrous British defeats at Gazala and Tobruk in June 1942.

Early military career
Fellers entered the United States Military Academy at West Point, New York in June 1916, ten months before the American entry into World War I. The increased need for junior officers during World War I caused Fellers's class to be accelerated and to graduate on November 1, 1918, ten days before the armistice with the German Reich which ended the war. Upon his graduation, Fellers was commissioned as a second lieutenant in the United States Army Coast Artillery Corps.

Fellers was promoted to first lieutenant in October 1919 and graduated from the Coast Artillery School Basic Course in 1920. The drastic reduction in the size of the army after the war created limited opportunities for promotion and so Fellers was not promoted to captain until December 3, 1934. In 1935, he graduated from the Command and General Staff School and the Chemical Warfare Service Field Officers Course, when he completed his soon-to-be-influential thesis "The Psychology of the Japanese Soldier."

Fellers served three tours of duty in the Philippines in the 1920s and the 1930s, including assignment to the Office of the Military Advisor to the Commonwealth Government of the Philippines, under General Douglas MacArthur; while there, Captain Fellers interacted with Major (later Lieutenant Colonel) Dwight D. Eisenhower, a senior member of MacArthur's staff. His assignments included helping to open the Philippine Military Academy, the Philippines' "West Point," and liaisoning with Philippine President Manuel Quezon. The Philippines awarded him its Distinguished Service Star for his contributions to its defenses.

Fellers graduated from the Army War College in 1939 and was promoted to major on July 1, 1940. He was promoted to lieutenant colonel in the war-footing Army of the United States (as compared to his rank of major in the Regular Army) on September 15, 1941, and to colonel the following month.

World War II

Italians and Germans access to Fellers's reports 
In October 1940, Major Fellers was assigned as military attaché to the U.S. embassy in Egypt. He was assigned the duty of monitoring and reporting on British military operations in the Mediterranean and Middle East Theatre. The British granted Fellers access to their activities and information. He dutifully reported everything he learned to his superiors in the United States. His reports were read by President Franklin Roosevelt, the head of American intelligence, and the Joint Chiefs of Staff.

Fellers was concerned about the security of the "Black Code" of the U.S. State Department, used when he sent his reports by radiogram. His concerns were overridden.  Fellers was right to be concerned, as the details of the code had been stolen from the U.S. embassy in Italy in September 1941 in a covert night raid into the embassy by Italian spies from the Servizio Informazioni Militare (SIM), the Italian military intelligence service. This enabled the Italians to read the reports, and within eight hours, the most secret data on British "strengths, positions, losses, reinforcements, supply, situation, plans, morale etc" would be in the hands of the German and the Italian militaries.

Around the same time, the Black Code was also broken by Nazi Germany's cryptanalysts. The Germans could identify Fellers's report, starting just before the U.S. entered into WWII until June 29, 1942, when Fellers switched to a newly adopted U.S. code system.

Fellers's deciphered radiograms provided the Axis with detailed, extensive, and timely information about troop movements and equipment. Information from his messages alerted the Axis to British convoy operations in the Battle of the Mediterranean, including efforts to resupply the garrison of Malta. In January 1942 information about numbers and the condition of British forces was provided to Generalleutnant Erwin Rommel (Generalfeldmarschall from May onwards), the German commander in Africa, who could thus plan his operations with reliable knowledge of what the opposing forces were. The Germans referred to Fellers as die gute Quelle ("the good source"). Rommel referred to him as "the little fellow."

The deciphered code cost the Allies many lives. For example, in June 1942, the British attempted to resupply Malta, which was under constant air attack and was being starved. The British determined to sail two supply convoys simultaneously in the hopes that if one were to become discovered, attacks upon it would distract the Axis from the other. Codenamed Operation Vigorous and Harpoon and sailing from Alexandria in the east and Gibraltar in the west, respectively, their sailing was timed with an effort by special forces teams to neutralize Axis ships and aircraft. Fellers efficiently reported all of that in his cable, No. 11119 dated June 11, which was intercepted in both Rome and by the German Military High Command Cipher Branch (OKW Chiffrierabteilung). It read, in part:

NIGHTS OF JUNE 12TH JUNE 13TH BRITISH SABOTAGE UNITS PLAN SIMULTANEOUS STICKER BOMB ATTACKS AGAINST AIRCRAFT ON 9 AXIS AIRDROMES. PLANS TO REACH OBJECTIVES BY PARACHUTES AND LONG RANGE DESERT PATROL.

British and Free French raiders went into action behind the lines in Libya and on the island of Crete. In most of the attacks, the raiders were met with accurate fire from the alerted garrisons and suffered heavy losses, but failed to inflict any damage upon the Luftwaffe. Their only success came when Fellers's unwitting early warnings were not received or were ignored or ineptly handled. Meanwhile, both convoys were located and came under attack. A day after leaving Gibraltar, Convoy Harpoon's six merchant ships and their escorts came under continuous air and surface attack. Only two of the merchant ships survived to reach Malta. Convoy Vigorous was the larger effort. Made up of 11 merchant ships, it suffered such serious losses that it was forced to turn back to Egypt.

Debates continue on how the breaking of the code Fellers was assigned had impacted the overall battle for North Africa. For example, John Ferris argues that because Fellers sometimes reported imperfect information and assessments, the leaks also contributed to Rommel's ultimate defeat: "In its last days of life, after Tobruk fell, the 'Good Source' bolstered Rommel's decision to drive all-out on Alexandria, his native over-optimism reinforced by Bonner Fellers' belief that the British would crack under one last blow. Both men were wrong; this time the intelligence failure led to German defeat." Other authors, like Robin Lewin, write that breaking Fellers's code was "immensely fruitfull", though at tactical level Lewin also pointed to Rommel's Wireless Interception Center for the Axis successes on the ground in the summer of 1942, at least until this unit lost its commander and several operatives in action at Tel El Eisa on 10 July 1942.

British discover leak from Egypt
Ultra intercepts seen only by the British indicated the Germans were gaining information from a source in Egypt, and British intelligence had considered Fellers as a possible source. On June 10, 1942, the British became convinced Fellers's reports were compromised because an intercept had compared British tactics negatively to American tactics. The British informed the Americans on June 12, who, on June 14, confirmed the finding that Fellers's reports were the source. Fellers switched codes on June 29, which ended the leaks.

Fellers was not found at fault for the interception of his reports, but he was transferred from Egypt on 7 July 1942. His successor as attaché used the US military cipher, which the Germans could not read. Upon returning to the United States, Fellers was decorated with the Distinguished Service Medal for his analysis and reporting of the North African situation. He was also promoted to brigadier general, the first in the West Point Class of 1918, on December 4, 1942.

While assigned to the Office of Strategic Services (OSS) in Washington, he was, as recalled by a colleague, "the most violent anglophobe I have encountered." However, that comment may be colored by the context of the American-British intelligence situation of the time. Fellers' North African reports, which his Distinguished Service Medal citation characterized as "models of clarity and accuracy," were bluntly critical of British weapons, operations, and leadership: "The Eighth Army has failed to maintain the morale of its troops; its tactical conceptions were always wrong, it neglected completely cooperation between the various arms; its reactions to the lightning changes in the battlefield were always slow." Such assessments, meant for American officials, were deciphered by the Germans, then intercepted from the Germans by the British Ultra signals intelligence.

Despite his anti-British attitude, Fellers and his reports influenced decisions to bring American supplies and troops to aid the British in North Africa. Throughout his tenure in North Africa, Fellers advocated for increased American support for the British in North Africa, which included both weapons and a commitment of American troops. This was at odds with the Joint Chiefs of Staff and the U.S. European Command as to the level of weapons support and an American troop landing. The military policy then was that saving the British in North Africa was not strategically required, especially not through a North Africa invasion (Operation Torch), which would divert focus from Operation Bolero, a plan for an early European invasion.

President Roosevelt admired Fellers' reports and was influenced by them enough so that on June 29, General George C. Marshall wrote to Roosevelt, "Fellers is a very valuable observer but his responsibilities are not those of a strategist and his views are in opposition to mine and those of the entire Operations Division." The President invited Fellers to the White House upon his return from Cairo, and they met on July 30, 1942. "Consistent with his previous reporting through 1942, Fellers argued for robust and expeditious reinforcement of British forces in the Middle East." Thus, Fellers' blunt criticism and his analysis of the Middle East's strategic importance may well have influenced Roosevelt's decisions to reinforce the Eighth Army and to support Operation Torch.

Transfer to Pacific
In the summer of 1943, Fellers left his job in the OSS, where he had played a role in planning psychological warfare, and he returned to the Southwest Pacific and resumed working under General Douglas MacArthur, who was then Commander of United States Army Forces in the Far East. Fellers served as military secretary and the Chief of Psychological Operations under MacArthur.

During the liberation of the Philippines from the Japanese, Fellers had several assignments, including Director of Civil Affairs for the Philippines.  For his efforts, Fellers received a second Philippine Distinguished Service Star.

General Dwight D. Eisenhower had been at odds with Fellers since they served together in the 1930s under General MacArthur in the Philippines. In a recollection in her personal diary, the Countess of Ranfurly wrote of a comment made by Eisenhower when she expressed admiration for Fellers. Eisenhower reportedly replied, "Any friend of Bonner Fellers is no friend of mine!" Eisenhower apologized the next day for his rudeness. Eisenhower may have developed such a view because he was aware of the North Africa leaks that had strained British relations and because Fellers had been instrumental in getting presidential approval of increased support for the British in North Africa including Operation Torch, which was not supported by the U.S. military command, including Eisenhower.

Post-war Japan

After the war, Fellers remained on the staff of MacArthur, who was Supreme Commander for the Allied Powers in the occupation of Japan. Among his duties was liaison between HQ and the Imperial Household. Soon after occupation began, Fellers wrote several influential memoranda concerning why it would be advantageous for the occupation, reconstruction of Japan, and long-term US interests to keep Emperor Hirohito in place if he was not clearly responsible for war crimes.

Fellers met with the major defendants of the Tokyo tribunal. Under an assignment with the codename "Operation Blacklist", Fellers allowed them to co-ordinate their stories to exonerate Hirohito and all members of his family of war crimes. This was done at the behest of MacArthur, who had decided that there was to be no criminal prosecution of the Emperor or his family.

General Fellers, who came from a Religious Society of Friends family (commonly known as Quakers) and attended the Quaker-affiliated Earlham College, was instrumental in the selection of Elizabeth Vining, an American Quaker educator, as tutor to the Emperor's children.

In 1971, Hirohito conferred on Fellers the Second Order of the Sacred Treasure "in recognition of your long-standing contribution to promoting friendship between Japan and the United States."

Fellers' role in exonerating Hirohito is the main subject of the 2012 film Emperor. Fellers was also featured as a protagonist in the 2022 alternative history novel Atomic Sunrise by R.M. Christianson.

Fellers was also familiar with the writings of Lafcadio Hearn and became a friend of Hearn's descendants in Japan, the Koizumi family.

Army retirement and later life

In October 1946, Fellers reverted to the rank of colonel as part of a reduction in rank of 212 generals. He retired from the army on November 30, 1946. In 1948, his retirement rank was reinstated as brigadier general.

After retiring from the Army, he worked for the Republican National Committee in Washington, D.C.. In 1952 Fellers was actively involved in promoting Robert A. Taft as a presidential candidate. Fellers was a member of the John Birch Society, which is named after a military intelligence officer, who was considered by its founding members to be the first casualty of the Cold War. In 1953 Fellers, wrote a book: Wings for Peace: A Primer for a New Defense (Chicago: Henry Regnery Co., 1953). In 1964, Fellers was actively involved in promoting Barry Goldwater for the presidency.

He died in Washington, D.C. on October 7, 1973, and was buried at Arlington National Cemetery.

Military awards

Foreign orders
 Order of the Sacred Treasure, 2nd Class: 1971

Promotions

See also
Emperor, a film in which Matthew Fox plays Brigadier General Fellers

References
Notes

Bibliography
 Behrendt, Hans-Otto "Rommel's Intelligence in the Desert Campaign: 1941–1943"   Irwin, 1985 
 Bix, Herbert P.  "Hirohito and the Making of Modern Japan"  Perennial, 2001
 Dower, John W. Embracing Defeat, 1999
 
 Ranfurly, Hermione  "To War With Whitaker: The Wartime Diaries of Countess of Ranfurly 1939–45"  Mandarin, 1994

External links
www.bonnerfellers.com, a website maintained by the family of Bonner Fellers.
The Bonner Frank Fellers papers, 1904-1997 are open and available for research at the Hoover Institution Archives, Stanford University.
Example of a report by Colonel Bonner Fellers which was intercepted and decoded by the Italians in 1942
Generals of World War II

1896 births
1973 deaths
United States Army Coast Artillery Corps personnel
American anti-communists
American expatriates in Japan
American expatriates in the Philippines
Burials at Arlington National Cemetery
Illinois Republicans
John Birch Society members
Military history of Japan
Military personnel from Illinois
New Right (United States)
Occupied Japan
Recipients of the Distinguished Service Medal (US Army)
Recipients of the Legion of Merit
Recipients of the Order of the Sacred Treasure
United States Army generals of World War II
United States Army generals
United States Army Command and General Staff College alumni
United States military attachés
United States Army War College alumni
United States Army personnel of World War I
United States Military Academy alumni
Washington, D.C., Republicans